The Imperial German Navy Zeppelin LZ 53 (L 17) was a P-class World War I zeppelin.

Operational history

The Imperial German Navy first launched it on 20 October 1915 and throughout its career took part in 27 reconnaissance missions; nine attacks on England dropping  bombs.

Destruction

Destroyed in its hangar at Tondern on 28 December 1916 when LZ 69 (L 24) caught fire.

Specifications

See also

List of Zeppelins

Bibliography
Notes

References 

 - Total pages: 276

Further reading

 

Airships of Germany
Hydrogen airships
Zeppelins
Aviation accidents and incidents in 1916
Accidents and incidents involving balloons and airships